The Foidel Canyon School, in Routt County, Colorado northwest of Oak Creek, Colorado, is a one-room schoolhouse built in 1923.  It was listed on the National Register of Historic Places in 1983.

It has also been known as Twentymile School. It has a partially enclosed belfry but the bell was gone before 1982.

Two additional contributing buildings were a teacherage and a coal shed.

References

External links

Schools in Colorado
One-room schoolhouses in Colorado
School buildings on the National Register of Historic Places in Colorado
National Register of Historic Places in Routt County, Colorado
School buildings completed in 1923